Pinky Sharon Kekana (born 14 July 1966) is a South African politician who is currently serving as the Deputy Minister in the Presidency. She was first appointed to the national executive in February 2018 when President Cyril Ramaphosa named her as Deputy Minister of Communications, an office she held until she was appointed to her current position in August 2021. 

A teacher by training, Kekana was formerly a Member of the Limpopo Provincial Legislature and served in the Limpopo Executive Council from 2009 to 2013 under Premier Cassel Mathale. She was first elected to the National Assembly in 2014. In addition, she was elected to the National Executive Committee of her political party, the African National Congress, in 2017; she was re-elected to a second five-year term in 2022.

Early life and career 
Kekana was born and raised in Bela-Bela in present-day Limpopo province (then part of the Transvaal). After earning a Bachelor of Arts in education, she worked as a secondary school teacher in Bela-Bela.

Provincial political career 
Kekana was first elected to the Limpopo Provincial Legislature in 1999, representing the African National Congress (ANC). By 2008, she was the Executive Mayor of Limpopo's Waterberg District Municipality. In that year, at a party elective conference held in July, Kekana was elected as Deputy Provincial Secretary of the ANC's Limpopo branch, serving under Provincial Chairperson Cassel Mathale and Provincial Secretary Joe Maswanganyi.

MEC for Roads and Transport: 2009–2012 
Pursuant to the 2009 general election, Kekana returned to the provincial legislature, and she was additionally appointed to the Limpopo Executive Council by Mathale in his capacity as Premier of Limpopo. Mathale appointed her Member of the Executive Council (MEC) for Roads and Transport. Her department was placed under administration by the national government in 2011. 

She was viewed as a political ally of Mathale and of ANC Youth League President Julius Malema. In 2012, the opposition Democratic Alliance called for her resignation after the Public Protector, Thuli Madonsela, said that Kekana had approved an improperly awarded state contract with a company linked to Malema. In a different report released the same year, Madonsela also said that Kekana had abused her position as MEC to "settle political scores" by ordering a traffic cop to arrest Thandi Moraka, a political opponent of Malema's. In December 2012, she concluded her term as ANC Deputy Provincial Secretary and was elected ANC Provincial Treasurer.

MEC for Economic Development: 2012–2013 
On 13 March 2012, when Premier Mathale announced a cabinet reshuffle in which Kekana swopped portfolios with Pitsi Moloto, becoming MEC for Economic Development, Environmental Affairs, and Tourism. In July 2013, the ANC asked Mathale to resign. His successor as Premier, Stan Mathabatha, announced a major reshuffle in which Kekana was one of eight MECs fired from the Executive Council; she was replaced by Charles Sekoati.

National political career 
The following year, in the 2014 general election, Kekana was elected to a five-year term in a seat in the National Assembly, the lower house of the national South African Parliament. She was ranked tenth on the ANC's provincial party list. In 2015, she was elected to the National Executive Committee of the ANC Women's League, and in December 2017, she was elected to the National Executive Committee of the mainstream ANC, ranked 47th of the 80 elected candidates by number of votes received.

On 27 February 2018, Kekana was appointed Deputy Minister of Communications by Cyril Ramaphosa, who had recently been elected as President of South Africa; Nomvula Mokonyane was appointed Minister of Communications in the same reshuffle. From November 2018, her portfolio was renamed Communications and Telecommunications, after Ramaphosa announced a merger of those respective ministries. In the 2019 general election, she was ranked 48th on the ANC's national party list and retained her legislative seat, as well as her position as Deputy Minister.

On 5 August 2021, Ramaphosa announced a mid-term reshuffle in which Kekana was appointed Deputy Minister in the Presidency, serving under Minister Mondli Gungubele. At the ANC's 55th National Conference in December 2022, she was re-elected to another five-year term on the party's National Executive Committee; by number of votes received, she was ranked 21st of the 80 candidates elected, receiving 1,518 votes across the 4,029 ballots cast in total.

Personal life 
As of 2014, Kekana was married to Jerry Manyama, a civil servant; they have at least one child, Grant Kekana, who is a professional football player.

References

External links 

 
 Ms Sharon Pinky Kekana at Parliament of South Africa
 Pinky Sharon Kekana at African National Congress

1966 births
Living people
Government ministers of South Africa
Members of the National Assembly of South Africa
Members of the Limpopo Provincial Legislature
African National Congress politicians